AKM Shahidul Haque was a Bangladeshi journalist who served as the editor of now defunct The Bangladesh Times. He was awarded Ekushey Padak in 1989 by the Government of Bangladesh.

Personal life
Haque was married to Kazi Shamsun Nahar (d. 2017), a short-story writer. Together they had a son, Shahriar Shahid (d. 2018), who served as the managing director of Bangladesh Sangbad Sangstha.

References

Bangladeshi journalists
Recipients of the Ekushey Padak
Year of birth missing
Place of birth missing
Place of death missing